Stacey Liapis (born August 19, 1974) is an American curler from Bemidji, Minnesota. She played much of her career on teams with her sister Kari Erickson. She is a two-time Olympian, in 1998 and 2002, and a two-time United States National Champion, in 1998 and 2001.

Curling career 
Liapis had a very successful juniors career, winning the United States Junior Championship four times and competing at the World Junior Championship five times. She started her competitive career playing third for her sister Kari, making it to the semifinals or better at the United States Junior Championships three years in a row, 1989 to 1991. In 1990 the Liapis sisters won the championship, along with Heidi Rollheiser and Roberta Breyen. At World's in Portage la Prairie, Manitoba they finished in sixth place with a 4–5 record. Starting in the 1991–92 season Erika Brown took over as skip for the team. Together Liapis and Brown won the next three United States Junior Championships in a row and medalled at each of the World Championships. At the 1992 and 1994 World Championships they earned the silver medal while in 1993 they earned bronze. During the 1995–96 season, her final as a junior curler, Liapis skipped her own team at Nationals, losing in the semifinals. She still got a chance to compete at one more World Junior Championship when Amy Becher's team asked her to be their alternate.

At the 1998 Winter Olympics Liapis was alternate for Lisa Schoeneberg's Team USA; they finished in fifth place with a 2–5 record. A few months later she won her first United States Women's Championship, playing second for her sister with Lori Kreklau at third and Ann Swisshelm at lead. As American champions they represented the United States at the 1998 World Women's Championship in Kamloops, British Columbia. They finished in ninth place with a 2–7 record. In 2001 Liapis won her second women's national championship, again playing second with her sister Kari as skip and Swisshelm as lead but this time with Debbie McCormick at third. At that year's World's they finished in sixth place with a 5–4 record. The team maintained the same lineup for the 2001–02 season, winning the Olympic Trials and finishing second at Nationals. At the 2002 Winter Olympics they entered the playoffs as the third seed team but lost their semifinal game to Switzerland's Luzia Ebnöther. In the bronze medal game they faced the number one seed Canada with skip Kelley Law, losing 5–9 to finish in fourth place.

Personal life 
Liapis was one of the athletes supported by Home Depot and the Olympic Job Opportunity Program, whereby she worked 20 hours a week, got paid for 40 and was given flexible working hours in order to complete her training requirements.

Teams

References

External links

1974 births
Living people
People from Bemidji, Minnesota
American female curlers
Olympic curlers of the United States
Curlers at the 1998 Winter Olympics
Curlers at the 2002 Winter Olympics
21st-century American women